The Winter Stallion, also known as The Christmas Stallion, is a 1992 British television Technicolor film directed by Peter Edwards and starring Daniel J. Travanti. A Welsh language version titled Eira Cynta'r Gaeaf was filmed back-to-back and broadcast on S4C, which produced the film.

Plot
Dai Davies (Eric Wyn) is a Welshman running a cash-strapped farm in modern Wales and raising his orphaned granddaughter Gwen (Sian MacLean) with the help of her godmother Nerys (Lynette Davies). When he dies unexpectedly, he leaves Gwen's guardianship to his estranged son Alan (Daniel J. Travanti), who has returned to Wales accompanied by his stepson Cliff Dean (Patrick Loomer). Alan's return pits himself against land developer Howard (Dafydd Hywel) and Cliff against Gwen's would-be suitor Gwilyn (Richard Lynch). As Alan and Gwen try to connect in the background of readying the farm's prize stallion Mabon for a race that could save the farm, Howard resorts to dirty tricks to try and force through the farm's sale.

Cast
 Daniel J. Travanti as Alan
 Lynette Davies as Nerys
 Siân MacLean as Gwen
 Patrick Loomer as Cliff
 Eric Wyn as Dal
 Meredith Edwards as Sam
 Richard Lynch as Gwilyn
 Dafydd Hywel as Howard
 Gillian Elisa as Mrs. Howard
 Brinley Jenkins as Mr. Jones
 Menna Trussler as Mrs. Jones
 Geoffrey Morgan as Jack
 Huw Emlyn as Blacksmith
 William Vaughan as Councillor

See also
 List of Christmas films

References

External links
 
 
 

1992 films
1992 television films
British Christmas films
British television films
Christmas television films
1990s English-language films
Films about horses
Films set in Wales
Films shot in Wales
Welsh-language films
1990s Christmas films